Ramli bin Tusin is a Malaysian politician from PAS. He was the Member of Perak State Legislative Assembly for Gunung Semanggol from 2008 to 2013. In 2004 Malaysian general election, he contested for the Gerik parliamentary seat but lost to the BN candidate, Datuk Dr Wan Hashim Wan Teh.

Election results

References 

Members of the Perak State Legislative Assembly
Malaysian Islamic Party politicians
Living people
Year of birth missing (living people)